Gennady Nikolayevich Lesun (born 5 September 1966) is a retired Belarusian professional footballer and currently a coach.

Honours
Dinamo Minsk
 Belarusian Premier League champion: 1992, 1992–93, 1993–94
 Belarusian Cup winner: 1992

External links
 

1966 births
Living people
Soviet footballers
Belarusian footballers
Belarus international footballers
Belarusian expatriate footballers
Expatriate footballers in Russia
Expatriate footballers in Israel
FC Dinamo Minsk players
Maccabi Herzliya F.C. players
Shimshon Tel Aviv F.C. players
FC Molodechno players
FC Anzhi Makhachkala players
Belarusian Premier League players
Association football defenders